Gerald Klug (born 13 November 1968) is an Austrian jurist and politician who served as minister of transport, innovation and technology in 2016. A member of the Social Democratic Party, he previously served as minister of defence and sports from 2013 to 2016.

Early life and education
Klug was born in Graz on 13 November 1968. After graduating from technical college in Graz and vocational school he served in the Austrian army from 1987 to 1988. He received a law degree from Karl-Franzens University in 2001.

Career
Klug is a member of the Social Democratic Party and chairman of the party in the Austrian Federal Council, Austria’s Upper House.  He was first elected to the council in 2005. He was appointed federal minister of defence and sports in the cabinet led by Prime Minister Werner Faymann on 11 March 2013, replacing Norbert Darabos in the post. On 28 January 2016 Klug's term ended and he was replaced by Hans Peter Doskozil in the post.

References

External links

21st-century Austrian politicians
1968 births
Austrian jurists
Austrian Ministers of Defence
Living people
Members of the Federal Council (Austria)
Politicians from Graz
Social Democratic Party of Austria politicians
University of Graz alumni